KUDV (106.9 FM) is a commercial radio station that serves the Bloomfield, Iowa and Ottumwa, Iowa area.  The station broadcasts a superstar country format.  KUDV is licensed to Mark and Karen McVey, through licensee Tri-Rivers Broadcasting Company. The station formerly simulcasted a classic hits format with KMEM-FM in Memphis, Missouri as "Mustang" until then-KDMU switched back to a gospel format and changed call signs back to KOJY.

The station was originally licensed as KXOF on June 21, 1982 but changed callsigns to KOJY on July 6, 2002 and to KDMU on February 27, 2006, only to change back to KOJY on July 14, 2009. The station changed its call sign to KUDV on September 3, 2016. On September 5, 2016 KUDV changed their format to classic hits.

On May 2, 2022 the station switched to a superstar country music format.

The transmitter and broadcast tower are located 2 miles northeast of Bloomfield along 
U.S. Route 63.

References

External links

UDV
Country radio stations in the United States
Radio stations established in 1986
1986 establishments in Iowa